The Old Nest is a 1921 American drama silent black and white film directed by Reginald Barker and starring Helene Chadwick. It was awarded for the National High School Students' Poll for Best Picture They Had Ever Seen. It is based on the short story by Rupert Hughes, which was one of the most notably adaptations as Behind the Screen (1916).

Cast

References

External links

 
 

Silent American drama films
1921 drama films
1921 films
American silent feature films
American black-and-white films
Films directed by Reginald Barker
Films with screenplays by Rupert Hughes
Films based on works by Rupert Hughes
Goldwyn Pictures films
1920s American films